Wabano Lake is located in La Tuque, in administrative region of Mauricie in the province of Quebec, in Canada. This lake is located in forest area.

Toponymy 
The toponym "Wabano Lake" was recorded on July 4, 1980 in the "Bank of place names" of Commission de toponymie du Québec.

Notes and references 

Lakes of Mauricie
Landforms of La Tuque, Quebec